Diphepanol is a cough suppressant.

References

Antitussives
1-Piperidinyl compounds